Ferdinand  (26 February 1861 – 10 September 1948), born Ferdinand Maximilian Karl Leopold Maria of Saxe-Coburg and Gotha (Фердинанд Максимилиан Карл Леополд Мария Сакс-Кобург и Гота), was the second monarch of the Third Bulgarian State, firstly as ruling prince (knyaz) from 1887 to 1908, and later as king (tsar) from 1908 until his abdication in 1918. Under his rule Bulgaria entered the First World War on the side of the Central Powers in 1915.

Family background

Ferdinand was born on 26 February 1861 in Vienna, a German prince of the House of Saxe-Coburg and Gotha-Koháry.  He was the son of Prince August of Saxe-Coburg and his wife Clémentine of Orléans, daughter of King Louis Philippe I of the French. Princess Maria Antonia Koháry was a Hungarian Noble and heiress who married Ferdinand’s grandfather, Prince Ferdinand of Saxe-Coburg and Gotha. Ferdinand was raised in his parents’ Catholic faith and baptised in St. Stephen's Cathedral, Vienna on 27 February, having as godparents Archduke Maximilian of Austria and his wife Princess Charlotte of Belgium. He grew up in the cosmopolitan environment of Austro-Hungarian high nobility and also in their ancestral lands in Hungary and in Germany. The House of Koháry descended from an immensely wealthy Upper Hungarian noble family, who held the princely lands of Čabraď and Sitno in present-day Slovakia, among others. The family's property was augmented by Clémentine of Orléans' remarkable dowry.

Ferdinand was a grandnephew of Ernest I, Duke of Saxe-Coburg and Gotha and of Leopold I, first king of the Belgians. His father August was a brother of King Ferdinand II of Portugal, and also a first cousin to Queen Victoria, her husband Albert, Empress Carlota of Mexico and her brother Leopold II of Belgium. These last two, Leopold and Carlota, were also first cousins of Ferdinand I's through his mother, a princess of Orléans. This made the Belgian siblings his first cousins, as well as his first cousins once removed. Indeed, the House of Saxe-Coburg and Gotha had contrived to occupy, either by marriage or by direct election, several European thrones in the course of the 19th century. Following the family trend, Ferdinand was himself to found the royal dynasty of Bulgaria.

Prince of Bulgaria

The previous ruling prince of Bulgaria, Alexander of Battenberg, had abdicated in 1886 after a pro-Russian coup, only seven years after he had been elected. Ferdinand, who was an officer in the Austro-Hungarian army, was elected Prince of autonomous Bulgaria by its Grand National Assembly on 7 July 1887 in the Gregorian calendar (the "New Style" used hereinafter).  The throne had been previously offered, before Ferdinand's acceptance, to princes from Denmark to the Caucasus and even to the King of Romania. The Russian tsar himself had nominated his aide, Nichols Dadian of Mingrelia, but his candidacy was rejected by the Bulgarians. Ferdinand's accession was greeted with disbelief in many of the royal houses of Europe; Queen Victoria, his father's first cousin, stated to her Prime Minister, "He is totally unfit ... delicate, eccentric and effeminate ... Should be stopped at once." To the amazement of his initial detractors, Ferdinand generally made a good account of himself during the first two decades of his reign.

Bulgaria's domestic political life was dominated during the early years of Ferdinand's reign by liberal party leader Stefan Stambolov, whose foreign policy saw a marked cooling in relations with Russia, formerly seen as Bulgaria's protector.

Stambolov's fall (May 1894) and subsequent assassination (July 1895) - likely planned by Ferdinand - paved the way for a reconciliation of Bulgaria with Russia, effected in February 1896 with Ferdinand's decision to convert his infant son, Prince Boris, from Roman Catholicism to Eastern Orthodox Christianity. However, this move earned him the animosity of his Catholic Austrian relatives, particularly that of his uncle, Emperor Franz Joseph I of Austria, as well as being excommunicated by Pope Leo XIII.

Tsar of Bulgaria

On 5 October 1908 (celebrated on 22 September), Ferdinand proclaimed Bulgaria's de jure independence from the Ottoman Empire (though the country had been de facto independent since 1878). He also proclaimed Bulgaria a kingdom, and assumed the title of tsar—a deliberate nod to the rulers of the earlier Bulgarian states. However, while the title tsar was translated as "emperor" in the First and Second Bulgarian empires, it was translated as "king" under Ferdinand and his successors. The Bulgarian Declaration of Independence was proclaimed by him at the Holy Forty Martyrs Church in Tarnovo, and was recognized by the Ottoman Empire and the other European powers. The Tarnovo Constitution was retained, with the word "prince" replaced by the word "tsar."

Ferdinand was known for being quite a character. On a visit to German Emperor Wilhelm II, his second cousin once removed, in 1909, Ferdinand was leaning out of a window of the New Palace in Potsdam when the Emperor came up behind him and slapped him on the bottom. Ferdinand was affronted by the gesture but the Kaiser refused to apologize. Ferdinand however exacted his revenge by awarding a valuable arms contract he had intended to give to the Krupp's factory in Essen to French arms manufacturer Schneider-Creusot. Another incident occurred on his journey to the funeral of his second cousin King Edward VII of the United Kingdom in 1910. A tussle broke out over where his private railway carriage would be positioned in relation to the heir presumptive to the Austro-Hungarian throne, Archduke Franz Ferdinand. The Archduke won out, having his carriage positioned directly behind the engine. Ferdinand's was placed directly behind. Realising the dining car of the train was behind his own carriage, Ferdinand obtained his revenge on the Archduke by refusing him entry through his own carriage to the dining car. On 15 July the same year during a visit to Belgium, Ferdinand also became the first head of state to fly in an airplane. He awarded the pilot of the plane with a medal when they landed.

Balkan Wars 1912-1913

Like many other rulers before him, Ferdinand desired the creation of a "new Byzantium", a desire that has to be interpreted as wanting to create a significant, essentially Christian, Balkan power, given that Bulgaria and Bulgarians had neither cultural, ethnic, historical nor linguistic affinity with the old Byzantine Empire, which was quintessentially Roman and, evolving through the centuries, Greek. In 1912, Ferdinand joined the other Balkan states in an assault on the Ottoman Empire to free occupied territories. He saw this war as a new crusade declaring it, "a just, great and sacred struggle of the Cross against the Crescent." Bulgaria contributed the most and also lost the greatest number of soldiers. The Great Powers insisted on the creation of an independent Albania. Though the Balkan League allies had fought together against the common enemy in the First Balkan War, that was not enough to overcome their mutual rivalries. In the original documents for the Balkan League, Serbia  had been pressured by Bulgaria to hand over most of Vardar Macedonia after it had conquered it from the Ottoman Empire. However Serbia, in response to the new Albanian state receiving territory in the north that it had expected to gain for itself, said that it would keep possession of the areas that its forces had occupied. Soon after, Bulgaria began the Second Balkan War when it invaded its recent allies Serbia and Greece to seize disputed areas, before being attacked itself by Romania and the Ottoman Empire. Although Bulgaria was defeated, the 1913 Treaty of Bucharest granted the Kingdom some territorial gains. The region of Western Thrace, giving access to the Aegean Sea was secured.

First World War and abdication 1915-1918

On 11 October 1915, the Bulgarian army attacked Serbia after signing a treaty with Austria-Hungary and Germany stating that Bulgaria would gain the territory it sought at the expense of Serbia. While he was not an admirer of German Emperor Wilhelm II or Austrian Emperor Franz Josef I—whom he described as "that idiot, that old dotard of a Francis Joseph".—Ferdinand wanted additional territorial gains after the humiliation of the Balkan Wars. This also entailed forming an alliance with his former enemy, the Ottoman Empire. This ranging of his country with the Central Powers made him a de facto supporter of Germany’s war aims and was not well received by the Allies. Edmund Gosse wrote:

“In this war, where the ranks of the enemy present to us so many formidable, sinister, and shocking figures, there is one, and perhaps but one, which is purely ridiculous. If we had the heart to relieve our strained feelings by laughter, it would be at the gross Coburg traitor, with his bodyguard of assassins and his hidden coat-of-mail, his shaking hands and his painted face. The world has never seen a meaner scoundrel, and we may almost bring ourselves to pity the Kaiser, whom circumstances have forced to accept on equal terms a potentate so verminous.”

During the initial phase of World War I, the Tsardom of Bulgaria achieved several decisive victories over its enemies and laid claim to the disputed territories of Macedonia after Serbia's defeat. For the next two years, the Bulgarian army shifted its focus towards repelling Allied advances from nearby Greece. They were also partially involved in the 1916 conquest of neighboring Romania, now ruled by another Ferdinand I, who was also Ferdinand's first cousin once removed.

To save the Bulgarian monarchy after multiple military setbacks in 1918, Tsar Ferdinand abdicated in favour of his eldest son, who became Tsar Boris III on 3 October 1918. Under new leadership, Bulgaria surrendered to the Entente and, as a consequence, lost not only the additional territory it had fought for in the major conflict, but also the territory it had won after the Balkan Wars giving access to the Aegean Sea.

Personal life

Ferdinand married Princess Marie Louise of Bourbon-Parma, daughter of Robert I, Duke of Parma and Princess Maria Pia of Bourbon-Two Sicilies, on 20 April 1893 at the Villa Pianore in Lucca. Steven Constant describes this as a "marriage of convenience". The marriage produced four children:
 Boris III (1894–1943)
 Kyril (1895–1945)
 Eudoxia (1898–1985)
 Nadezhda (1899–1958).

Marie Louise died on 31 January 1899 after giving birth to her youngest daughter. Ferdinand did not think about remarriage until his mother, Princess Clémentine died in 1907. To satisfy dynastic obligations and to provide his children with a mother figure, Ferdinand married Princess Eleonore Reuss of Köstritz, on 28 February 1908.  Neither romantic love or physical attraction played any role, and Ferdinand treated her as no more than a member of the household, and showed scant regard.

In his private relations, Ferdinand was a somewhat hedonistic individual. Bisexual throughout his life, up until early middle age his inclination was more towards women. He enjoyed affairs with a number of women of humble position, siring a number of illegitimate children whom he then supported financially. In his later life, rumours abounded of Ferdinand's trysts with lieutenants and valets. His regular holidays on Capri, then a popular holiday destination with wealthy epicenes, were common knowledge in royal courts throughout Europe. In 1895 an interview given by the embittered former Prime Minister, Stefan Stambolov to the Frankfurter Zeitung created a nine-day scandal across Europe, when he focused strongly on his personal witness of Ferdinand's homosexual interests.

Exile and death 1918-1948
After his abdication, Ferdinand returned to live in Coburg, Germany. He had managed to salvage much of his fortune and was able to live in some style. He saw his being in exile simply as one of the hazards of kingship. He commented, "Kings in exile are more philosophic under reverses than ordinary individuals; but our philosophy is primarily the result of tradition and breeding, and do not forget that pride is an important item in the making of a monarch. We are disciplined from the day of our birth and taught the avoidance of all outward signs of emotion. The skeleton sits forever with us at the feast. It may mean murder, it may mean abdication, but it serves always to remind us of the unexpected. Therefore we are prepared and nothing comes in the nature of a catastrophe. The main thing in life is to support any condition of bodily or spiritual exile with dignity. If one sups with sorrow, one need not invite the world to see you eat." He was pleased that the throne could pass to his son. Ferdinand was not displeased with exile and spent much of his time devoted to artistic endeavors, gardening, travel and natural history.

However, he would live to see the collapse of everything he had held to be precious in life. His eldest son and successor, Boris III, died under mysterious circumstances after returning from a visit to Hitler in Germany in 1943. Boris' son, Simeon II, succeeded him only to be deposed in 1946, ending the Bulgarian monarchy. The Kingdom of Bulgaria was succeeded by the People's Republic of Bulgaria, under which Ferdinand's other son, Kyril, was executed. On hearing of Kyril's death he said, "Everything is collapsing around me."

In 1947 Ferdinand (then 86 years old) secretly married his 26-year-old assistant Alžbeta Brezáková in Bamberg, Germany, much to the displeasure of the members of his family. After his death, she returned to her homeland Czechoslovakia, where she remarried and had a daughter. Being afraid of what the communist regime might do to her, she only told her daughter about her marriage to Ferdinand two years before her death. She survived her husband by 67 years and died in Bratislava, Slovakia in 2015.

Ferdinand died in Bürglass-Schlösschen on 10 September 1948 in Coburg, Germany, cradle of the Saxe-Coburg-Gotha dynasty. He was the last surviving grandchild of Louis-Philippe of France. His final wish was to be buried in Bulgaria. However, the Communist authorities in Bulgaria would not allow it, so he was buried in the family crypt in St. Augustin, Coburg.

Honours

Bulgarian 
 Grand Cross of St. Alexander, in Diamonds, 27 May 1883
 Founder and Grand Master of the Civil Merit Order, 1891
 Founder and Grand Master of the Military Merit Order, 19 May 1900
 Founder and Grand Master of the Order of Saints Cyril and Methodius, 18 May 1909

Foreign

Honorary military appointments 

 : Colonel of the 54th Minsk Regiment, 1902

Ancestors

See also 
 Order of Saints Cyril and Methodius

References

Books

External links

 
 Historical photographs of the royal palace in Sofia
 Encyclopædia Britannica
 
 

|-

1861 births
1948 deaths
19th-century Bulgarian monarchs
19th-century LGBT people
20th-century Bulgarian monarchs
Bisexual men
Bisexual military personnel
Bulgarian people of the Balkan Wars
Bulgarian people of World War I
Eastern Orthodox monarchs
Field marshals of Germany
Governors-General of Eastern Rumelia
House of Saxe-Coburg and Gotha (Bulgaria)
LGBT royalty
Bulgarian LGBT people
Monarchs who abdicated
Nobility from Vienna
Princes of Saxe-Coburg and Gotha
Grand Master of the Order of Military Merit (Bulgaria)
Recipients of the Order of Bravery

Grand Crosses of the Military Order of Maria Theresa
Grand Crosses of the Military Order of Max Joseph
2
2
Grand Crosses of the Order of Saint Stephen of Hungary
Grand Officiers of the Légion d'honneur
Annulled Honorary Knights Grand Cross of the Royal Victorian Order
Annulled Honorary Knights Grand Cross of the Order of the Bath
Knights of the Golden Fleece of Austria
Knights Grand Cross of the Order of Saints Maurice and Lazarus
Recipients of the Iron Cross (1914), 1st class
Recipients of the Order of the Crown (Italy)
Recipients of the Order of St. Anna, 1st class
Recipients of the Order of St. Vladimir, 1st class
Recipients of the Order of the White Eagle (Russia)
Recipients of the Pour le Mérite (military class)
Grand Crosses of the Order of Saint-Charles
20th-century LGBT people